The Ford Fiesta R5 is a rally car built by M-Sport and based upon the Ford Fiesta ST road car. It was the first car homologated under the R5 regulations that were introduced in 2013. The Fiesta R5 made its competitive début in 2013 and has competed in the World Rally Championship-2, European Rally Championship and various national competitions since then. An updated model known as the Fiesta R5 Mk. II was unveiled in 2019. Starting in 2019, M-Sport Ford WRT will enter factory-supported Fiesta R5s and Fiesta R5 Mk. IIs in the World Rally Championship-2.

Kajetan Kajetanowicz won the 2015, 2016 and 2017 European Rally Championship driver's titles driving a Fiesta R5, while Alexey Lukyanuk won the 2018 title.

Results

World Rally Championship-2 Pro victories

World Rally Championship-2 victories

European Rally Championship victories

See also

 Ford Fiesta WRC
 Group R
 Citroën C3 R5
 Hyundai i20 R5
 Škoda Fabia R5
 Volkswagen Polo GTI R5

References

External links

 https://web.archive.org/web/20131007121611/http://www.m-sport.co.uk/index.php/motorsport/the-rally-cars/ford-fiesta-r5
 Rally results of Ford Fiesta R5
 Technical information, news and chassis register of Ford Fiesta R5

R5 cars
R5
All-wheel-drive vehicles